The GP Stad Vilvoorde is a single-day cycle race held each year in and around the Belgian city of Vilvoorde. The race was first organized in 1931.

The race was Eddy Merckx's first professional win, with his victory in the 1965 edition.

Winners

References

Cycle races in Belgium
Recurring sporting events established in 1931
1931 establishments in Belgium